Daniel Chandler is an American singer from St. Louis, Missouri. He is best known for his work with rock band Evans Blue. Chandler was also the lead vocalist for the band Fight or Flight.

History 
Chandler was born and raised in St. Louis, Missouri. Growing up, he expected to pursue a career in baseball. Right after high school, he began playing guitar and writing songs. Chandler was previously part of the band Switch 3. The band started in St. Louis but relocated to Los Angeles, looking to sign with a major label. The singer later moved back to St. Louis after a failed signing attempt. Chandler heard Toronto-based Evans Blue was looking for a lead singer and contacted the band to see what they were looking for. He joined the band in 2009.

Dan Donegan, guitarist for Disturbed, contacted Chandler with an idea of possible collaboration. When Donegan and Chandler had enough material they contacted Disturbed drummer Mike Wengren and began recording. The band Fight or Flight was created as a side project and signed with Warner Bros. Records in 2013.

Discography

Switch Three
 Don Chandler (2003) – EP
 Simon Says (2005) – EP

Evans Blue

Albums 
 Evans Blue (2009)
 Graveyard of Empires (2012)
 Letters from the Dead (2016)

Fight or Flight

Albums 
 A Life by Design? (2013)

A Strange Day of Calm
 That's Just You (2014) – Single
 Since I Don't Have You (2014) – Single

Guest appearances
 More Than This (guest vocals for "HeavensDust") (2014)

References 

Living people
1975 births